Las Minas   is a town and corregimiento in Las Minas District, Herrera Province, Panama with a population of 1,975 as of 2010. It is the seat of Las Minas District. Its population as of 1990 was 1,981; its population as of 2000 was 2,209.

References

Corregimientos of Herrera Province